Madeleine Melisande Ermens-van Toorenburg (born 10 May 1968) is a Dutch politician serving as a member of the House of Representatives for the Christian Democratic Appeal (Christen-Democratisch Appèl – CDA) since 1 March 2007. She focuses on matters of judiciary and other judicial affairs.

References 
  Parlement.com biography

External links 

  House of Representatives biography

1968 births
Living people
People from Rosmalen
Christian Democratic Appeal politicians
Members of the House of Representatives (Netherlands)
Politicians from The Hague
21st-century Dutch politicians
21st-century Dutch women politicians